Mantra is a 2016 Indian Hindi-language drama film directed Nicholas Kharkongor. The film stars Rajat Kapoor, Kalki Koechlin, Shiv Panditt, and Lushin Dubey in pivotal roles. The film was jointly produced by Filmart Productions, North East Filmsn Shri Production, Zenyth Media House.

Plot 
Mantra tells the story of a businessman Kapil Kapoor and his family in the backdrop of changing India in the first decade of the new millennium.

Cast 
The cast of the film is as follows:
 Rajat Kapoor as Kapil Kapoor
 Lushin Dubey as Meenakshi Kapoor
 Kalki Koechlin as Piya Kapoor
 Shiv Panditt as Viraj Kapoor
 Adil Hussain Man from Jharkhand
 Rohan Joshi as Vir Kapoor
 Yuri Suri as Mohan Kaul
 Maya Krishna Rao as Shazia Siddiqui

Production
Mantra was written and directed by Nicholas Kharkongor. The film was jointly produced by Filmart Productions, North East Films, Shri Production, Zenyth Media House and Bhavana Goparaju as an Associate Producer.

Release
Mantra had its world premiere at the 2016 South Asian International Film Festival.

Critical reception
Upon release in India, the film received mixed  response. Ranjibdar in his review of the film wrote, "Rajat Kapoor shows he has the able shoulders to carry us through the autumn of the patriarch, but Kharkongor’s script fails him, refusing to go into the labyrinth of inner turmoil, and trying awakening." He also wrote that the film resembles Zoya Akhtar’s Dil Dhadakne Do.

References

External links 

2016 films
2010s Hindi-language films